James Chambers may refer to:

James Chambers (pastoralist) (1811–1862), South Australian colonist
James Chambers (politician) (1863–1917), Irish lawyer and Unionist
James Chambers (English footballer) (born 1980), retired football player
James Chambers (Irish footballer) (born 1987), retired football player
James Chambers (horn player) (1920–1989), American musician
James Cox Chambers (born 1950s), American billionaire heir
James Chambers, English musician with Bob Kerr's Whoopee Band
James Chambers (born 1948), commonly known as Jimmy Cliff, Jamaican reggae musician
James S. Chambers (publisher) (1821–1904), American publisher of the Philadelphia Bulletin
USS James S. Chambers, schooner  named for the publisher
James S. Chambers (editor) (1853–1923), American editor of Public Ledger and grandfather of Whittaker Chambers
James Chambers (writer) (born 1970], American author and comic book writer
James F. Chambers Jr., (1913–2006), American newspaperman